is a retired Japanese speed skater. He competed at the 1968 and 1972 Winter Olympics in the 500 m events and finished in 37th and 13th place, respectively. His best achievement in the world sprint championships was fourth place in 1971.

Personal bests:
 500 m – 38.4 (1971)
 1000 m – 1:20.8 (1971)
 1500 m – 2:07.9 (1971)

References

External links

1944 births
Living people
Olympic speed skaters of Japan
Speed skaters at the 1968 Winter Olympics
Speed skaters at the 1972 Winter Olympics
Universiade medalists in speed skating
Universiade bronze medalists for Japan
Competitors at the 1968 Winter Universiade